Boris Garrós Torrent (born 22 June 1988) is a Spanish professional footballer who plays for CD El Ejido as a forward.

Club career

Early career
Born in Barcelona, Catalonia, Garrós made his senior debut with CE Europa in the 2007–08 season, in Tercera División. In the following years, he played in the same tier, representing CD Masnou, UE Castelldefels, UE Cornellà before joining Segunda División B side UE Sant Andreu in the 2013 summer.

On 22 September, he made his debut, coming on as a substitute for Ferrón in a 1–0 defeat against CF Reus Deportiu.

After a stint with AE Prat in 2014, Garrós returned to the fourth tier and joined UE Rubí. In his only season for the club, he scored 10 goals in 21 games. On 27 January 2015, he signed for CE L'Hospitalet.

In early 2016, Garrós joined CF Gavà. During the 2016–17 season, he scored his career best of 25 goals in 48 matches, with his side being relegated back to Tercera División.

Recreativo Huelva
On 15 August 2017, he moved to Recreativo de Huelva on a one-year contract. He scored on his debut four days later, in a 3–2 defeat against FC Cartagena. In August 2018, Garrós rejected an offer from Indian club East Bengal citing personal reasons.

Apollon Smyrni / Politehnica Iași
On 15 September, he moved abroad and joined Superleague Greece club Apollon Smyrnis. On 31 January 2019 he signed a 6 month contract with Romanian side Politehnica Iași.

References

External links

1988 births
Living people
Association football forwards
Footballers from Barcelona
Spanish footballers
Segunda División B players
Tercera División players
CE Europa footballers
CD Masnou players
UE Cornellà players
UE Sant Andreu footballers
AE Prat players
UE Rubí players
CE L'Hospitalet players
CF Gavà players
Recreativo de Huelva players
CE Sabadell FC footballers
CD El Ejido players
Super League Greece players
Apollon Smyrnis F.C. players
Liga I players
FC Politehnica Iași (2010) players
Spanish expatriate footballers
Expatriate footballers in Greece
Expatriate footballers in Romania
Spanish expatriate sportspeople in Greece
Spanish expatriate sportspeople in Romania